This article lists events that occurred during 1922 in Estonia.

Incumbents
Head of State – Konstantin Päts
Head of State – Juhan Kukk

Events
22 September – Estonia joined the League of Nations.

Births
16 February – Lilli Promet, Estonian writer
11 April – Arved Viirlaid, Estonian writer

Deaths

 May 4 – Viktor Kingissepp, Estonian Communist politician (b. 1888; executed)

References

 
1920s in Estonia
Estonia
Estonia
Years of the 20th century in Estonia